The 2022 Mexico City Open was a professional tennis tournament played on clay courts. It was the first edition of the tournament which was part of the 2022 ATP Challenger Tour. It took place in Mexico City, Mexico between 4 and 10 April 2022.

Singles main-draw entrants

Seeds

 1 Rankings are as of 21 March 2022.

Other entrants
The following players received wildcards into the singles main draw:
  Luis Carlos Álvarez
  Alex Hernández
  Nicolás Jarry

The following players received entry into the singles main draw as alternates:
  Viktor Durasovic
  Denis Istomin
  Peđa Krstin
  Bernard Tomic

The following players received entry from the qualifying draw:
  Mateus Alves
  Nicolás Barrientos
  Nick Chappell
  Elmar Ejupovic
  Gilbert Klier Júnior
  Keegan Smith

Champions

Singles

  Marc-Andrea Hüsler def.  Tomás Martín Etcheverry 6–4, 6–2.

Doubles

  Nicolás Jarry /  Matheus Pucinelli de Almeida def.  Jonathan Eysseric /  Artem Sitak 6–2, 6–3.

References

2022 ATP Challenger Tour
2022 in Mexican tennis
April 2022 sports events in Mexico